Brandon Jaime London (born October 16, 1984) is a retired Canadian football wide receiver who last played with the Montreal Alouettes of the Canadian Football League. He was signed by the New York Giants as an undrafted free agent in 2007. He played college football at Massachusetts.

London has also played for the Miami Dolphins and Pittsburgh Steelers. He earned a Super Bowl ring as a member of the Giants' practice squad in Super Bowl XLII. He is the son of college football coach Mike London.

College career
London led UMass in receptions (50) and receiving yards (781) during his senior year (2006).  He
finished second at UMass in career catches with 148, and became only the seventh UMass player with 100 or more career catches.  He ranks third on the school's all-time list in receiving yards with 2,022.  He is tied for fourth in career receiving TDs at UMass with 15, and is tied for fifth-best in single-season receiving touchdowns with 9.

Statistics

NFL career

New York Giants
London was originally signed in 2007 to the New York Giants practice squad, but was signed to the active roster on February 2, 2008. He was later released on August 30, 2008 during final cuts.

Miami Dolphins
A day after being waived by the Giants, London was claimed off waivers by the Miami Dolphins on August 31, 2008. The team waived receiver Anthony Armstrong to make room for London.
After a lackluster performance in the 2009 NFL preseason, London was waived by the Miami Dolphins on September 5, 2009.

Pittsburgh Steelers
London signed a future contract with the Pittsburgh Steelers on February 9, 2010. London was cut by the Pittsburgh Steelers on September 3, 2010.

CFL career

Montreal Alouettes

Brandon London signed with the Montreal Alouettes of the Canadian Football League near the close of the 2010 CFL season. He did not play in any CFL games that season. In the 2011 season London played in all 18 games and scored his first CFL touchdown on September 11, 2011. Despite only playing in 12 games in the 2012 season he added more yardage and touchdowns than in his first season in the league. On March 18, 2013 the Alouettes signed London to a 3-year contract extension.

On June 4, 2015, London announced his retirement from the Canadian Football League.

Statistics

Personal
His father, Mike London, is the head coach of the William & Mary Tribe, having previously served as the head coach for the Richmond Spiders for two seasons, including leading the team to a national championship his first season as head coach in 2008, and defensive line coach for the Houston Texans in 2005.

He now works for the New York Post.

References

External links

Montreal Alouettes bio 
Miami Dolphins bio
New York Giants bio
UMass Minutemen bio

1984 births
Living people
Sportspeople from Richmond, Virginia
Players of American football from Richmond, Virginia
African-American players of American football
African-American players of Canadian football
American football wide receivers
Canadian football wide receivers
UMass Minutemen football players
New York Giants players
Miami Dolphins players
Pittsburgh Steelers players
Montreal Alouettes players
21st-century African-American sportspeople
20th-century African-American people
Players of Canadian football from Virginia